Israel had more companies listed in 2012 on the NASDAQ stock exchange than any country outside the United States, save China. As of 2011, some sixty Israeli companies are listed on the Nasdaq. 2000 was the year that saw the most new Israeli listings on the exchange – 33 companies. Through the years, many have been acquired, merged with other companies, privatized, or gone out of business. Since the 1980s over 250 Israeli companies had an initial public offering on the Nasdaq. As of August 2017, one Israeli company was listed on the NASDAQ-100 index: Check Point Software.

List of Israeli companies currently quoted on Nasdaq

This is a list of Israeli companies quoted on the NASDAQ electronic stock exchange as of 5 October 2020.

List of Israeli companies formerly quoted on Nasdaq

See also
List of Israeli companies
List of Israeli companies quoted on the ASX
List of multinationals with research and development centres in Israel
Science and technology in Israel
Silicon Wadi

References 

Companies